Yasser Larouci (born 1 January 2001) is a professional footballer who plays as a left-back for Ligue 1 club Troyes. Born in Algeria, he plays for the France U21s.

Club career

Youth
Larouci was a player rated at Le Havre, where he was the captain of their U17 side. He rejected their contract extension and subsequently became a free agent and was targeted by many top European teams.

Larouci was transferred to Liverpool after receiving international clearance in November 2017, and has subsequently represented the club at U18 and U21 level. U18 Coach described him as "aggressive and "lightning quick". Initially trained as a winger, he was converted to an attacking full back.  In his new position, Larouci helped Liverpool win a fourth FA Youth Cup in 2019, after defeating Manchester City on penalties in the final.

Liverpool
Larouci started training with the first team in the summer of 2019. He made his non-competitive debut for the Liverpool first team in July 2019, in a friendly against Tranmere Rovers, which Liverpool won 6–0. He was subsequently included in their pre-season tour starting at left back against 3–1 Bradford City, 2–3 Borussia Dortmund, and 1–2 Sevilla, where he was stretchered off after a challenge by Joris Gnagnon, which led to the Sevilla player being red-carded.

He made his first team debut for Liverpool on 5 January 2020, in an FA Cup third round match against Everton, after James Milner's early injury.

Larouci was released at the end of the 2020–21 season.

Troyes
On 26 July 2021, he joined Troyes.

International career 
Larouci holds dual nationality between Algeria and France, and is eligible to represent either nation. He made his debut for the France national under-21 football team in March 2022, scoring against Northern Ireland on his first appearance.

Career statistics

Club

Honours
Liverpool U18
 FA Youth Cup: 2018–19

References

External links 
 
 

2001 births
People from El Oued
Living people
French footballers
France under-21 international footballers
Algerian footballers
French sportspeople of Algerian descent
Algerian emigrants to France
Association football fullbacks
Le Havre AC players
Liverpool F.C. players
ES Troyes AC players
Ligue 1 players
French expatriate footballers
Algerian expatriate footballers
Expatriate footballers in England
French expatriate sportspeople in England
Algerian expatriate sportspeople in England